Dum na predmesti (The House in the Suburbs) is a 1933 Czechoslovak comedy film, directed by Miroslav Cikán. It stars  Antonie Nedošinská, Hugo Haas, and Hana Vítová. It is based on a book by Karel Poláček. The film is about the bitter struggles of the tenants of a suburban house who face increased rent.

Cast
Antonie Nedošinská as Anna Faktorová the landlady
Hugo Haas as Zajícek
Hana Vítová as Vera the pianist
Jindřich Plachta as Jan Mejstrík, shopkeeper
Jaroslav Vojta as Václav Supita, shoemaker

References

External links
Dum na predmesti at the Internet Movie Database

1933 films
Czechoslovak comedy films
1933 comedy films
Films directed by Miroslav Cikán
Czech comedy films
Czechoslovak black-and-white films
1930s Czech-language films
1930s Czech films